RPK (Ruchnoy Pulemyot Kalashnikova) is a Soviet light machine gun.

RPK may also refer to:

 Raja Petra Kamarudin (born 1950), Malaysian editor
 Revenue passenger kilometre, a measure of traffic
 Royal Park railway station (station code), Melbourne, Australia
 Rocketplane Kistler (RpK), a former aerospace company
 RPK (rapper), stage name of the Finnish rapper Roope Kinnunen